The  brown-throated fulvetta or Ludlow's fulvetta (Fulvetta ludlowi) is a species of bird in the family Paradoxornithidae. Like the other typical fulvettas, it was long included in the Timaliidae genus Alcippe or in the Sylviidae. 
It is found in Bhutan, China, India, Myanmar, and Nepal.

References

Collar, N. J. & Robson, C. 2007. Family Timaliidae (Babblers)  pp. 70 – 291 in; del Hoyo, J., Elliott, A. & Christie, D.A. eds. Handbook of the Birds of the World, Vol. 12. Picathartes to Tits and Chickadees. Lynx Edicions, Barcelona.

brown-throated fulvetta
Birds of Bhutan
Birds of Northeast India
brown-throated fulvetta
brown-throated fulvetta
Taxonomy articles created by Polbot